Sterling Correctional Facility (SCF) is located in Sterling, Colorado and is the largest prison in the Colorado Department of Corrections system.

State statute dictated that prisoners with death sentences were to be held at the administrative segregation facility at the Colorado State Penitentiary. In 2011, the State of Colorado moved its death row prisoners to Sterling in order to settle a federal lawsuit filed by Nathan Dunlap, a death row prisoner. Dunlap had complained about the state's lack of outdoor exercise facilities at Colorado State Penitentiary. The inmates returned to Colorado State Penitentiary in 2015 after the outdoor access issue was resolved.

Notable Inmates
Allen Andrade, first conviction for a hate crime involving a transgender victim
Troy Graves, serial rapist and murderer
Scott Lee Kimball, serial killer imprisoned at Sterling until 2017 escape attempt
Marc Patrick O’Leary, serial rapist

References

External links

Sterling Correctional Facility - Department of Corrections
US Engineering history, specifications, and power engineering description

Prisons in Colorado
Buildings and structures in Sterling, Colorado